St. Matthias' Church, also known as the South Bazar Church, is a parish of the Malankara Orthodox Syrian Church situated at Kunnamkulam in the Thrissur district of Kerala, India. It is commonly known as Ambala Palli. The church is old and it is situated at the middle of south bazar, north of the Anjoor-Kunnamkulam road and west of the Guruvayoor-Kunnamkulam road.

The church was converted from a Hindu temple at the behest of Shakthan Thampuran, the king of Cochin after the request of the Christians. The architectural style of the temple was retained, making the church's appearance distinctive.

References

Churches in Thrissur district
Malankara Orthodox Syrian church buildings
18th-century churches in India
18th-century Oriental Orthodox church buildings